William Frederick Burnikell (9 December 1910 – May 1980) was an English professional football player and manager. His surname was also spelt Burnicle.

Career
Born in Southwick, Burnikell played as a left half for Lincoln City, Bradford City and Aldershot. For Lincoln City, he made 25 appearances in the Football League. For Bradford City, he made 52 appearances in the Football League, scoring two goals; he also made 3 FA Cup appearances.

He later became a football manager and was in charge of Halifax Town between April and December 1956. He also managed Swedish clubs Landskrona BoIS, Helsingborg, Örebro SK and Degerfors IF. He also won the Chilean Primera División in 1954 with Universidad Católica.

Sources

References

1910 births
1980 deaths
English footballers
English football managers
Lincoln City F.C. players
Bradford City A.F.C. players
Aldershot F.C. players
English Football League players
Halifax Town A.F.C. managers
Helsingborgs IF managers
Landskrona BoIS managers
Örebro SK managers
Degerfors IF managers
Club Deportivo Universidad Católica managers
Expatriate football managers in Chile
Expatriate football managers in Sweden
Association football midfielders
English expatriate football managers
English expatriate sportspeople in Sweden
British expatriates in Chile